El Último Romántico (The Last Romantic) is the fifteenth studio album by Salvadoran singer Álvaro Torres, released on February 10, 1998 through EMI Latin. The album was produced by himself and Nelson Gonzalez and recorded in four different studios.

The single "El Último Romántico" was Torres' last international hit, peaking at number 12 in May 1998 on the Billboard Hot Latin Tracks chart.

Track listing

Personnel 
Credits adapted from El Último Romántico liner notes.

Vocals

 Álvaro Torres – lead vocals
 Kenny O'Brien – backing vocals
 Maria del Rey – backing vocals
 Cleto Escobedo – backing vocals
 Carlos Murguía – backing vocals
 Gisa Vatcky – backing vocals

Musicians

 César Benítez – arrangements, keyboards
 George Doering – electric guitar, acoustic guitar
 Pedro Eustache – flute
 Enrique Martinez – accordion
 Jorge Moraga – string section
 Ramón Stagnaro – acoustic guitar
 Michael Thompson – electric guitar
 Roberto Vally – bass
 Carlos Yega – drums
 Ramon Yslas – percussion

Production

 Álvaro Torres – production
 Nelson Gonzalez – production, coordination
 Benny Faccone – mixing, engineering
 César Benítez – programming
 Dale Lawton – engineering assistance, mixing assistance
 Jonathan Burtner – engineering assistance, mixing assistance
 Jordan d'Alessio – engineering assistance, mixing assistance
 Rich Veltrop – engineering assistance, mixing assistance
 Cristina Abaroa – production coordination

Recording

 Recorded in House Of Blues, Encino, CA; Mad Hatter, Los Angeles, CA; Sound About, Van Nuys, CA; Westlake Studios, Hollywood, CA.

References 

1998 albums
Álvaro Torres albums